The Skoda 14 cm/56 naval gun was built by the Škoda Works for export during the 1930s. The few guns built were sold to Yugoslavia to equip their large destroyers. A class of three flotilla leaders was intended to be built but only Dubrovnik was completed. After the conquest of Yugoslavia in April 1941, the ships were taken over by the Royal Italian Navy (Regia Marina) and the Kriegsmarine in turn.

References

External links
The Skoda 14 cm/56 gun on Navweaps.com

World War II naval weapons
140 mm artillery
Military equipment introduced in the 1930s